Landersville is an unincorporated community in Lawrence County, Alabama, United States, located  west of Moulton.

History
The community is named for John Landers, who lived in the area. A post office operated under the name Landersville from 1851 to 1959.

Demographics

Landersville was listed on the 1880 U.S. Census as an unincorporated community of 67 residents. It was the only time it has been listed on the census rolls.

References

Unincorporated communities in Lawrence County, Alabama
Unincorporated communities in Alabama